The 2013–14 season of the Turkish Women's First Football League is the 18th season of Turkey's premier women's football league. Konak Belediyespor is the champion of the season

Teams

Before the start of the season, Lüleburgaz 39 Spor and Çamlıcaspor notified the Turkish Football Federation that they concluded not to participate in the league in the 2013–14 season.

Standings

First stage

Results

Championship group

Results

References

External links
 Kadınlar 1. Ligi 2013 - 2014 Sezonu 

2013
2013–14 domestic women's association football leagues
Women's